Raoni Guerra Lucas Rajão (August 1st 1981) is a Brazilian environmental scientist and associate professor in environmental management and social studies of science & technology in the Department of Production Engineering at the Federal University of Minas Gerais (UFMG) in Brazil. He is a member of the Brazilian Academy of Science (ABC) and a fellow at the Woodrow Wilson International Center for Scholars (Wilson Center) in the U.S.

He has been taking part in the international discussions about climate change and sustainability at United Nations Conference of the Parties since 2014 and, along his career, has collaborated with agencies of the United Nations, Inter-American Development Bank, and the German Technical Cooperation (GIZ). He has advised Brazilian government employees regarding environmental policies.

Career 
Rajão holds a degree in Computer Science from the University of Milano-Bicocca (2005), in Italy, a Master's in Information Technology, Change Management (2007) and a Ph.D. in Organization, Work and Technology (2011) both from the University of Lancaster, in England. In 2011, he started working as an adjunct professor at the Federal University of Minas Gerais. There he founded, in 2012, the Laboratory of Environmental Services Management (LAGESA). In 2022, he became vice-coordinator of the Centre for Remote Sensing (CSR) at UFMG.  Rajão is also a professor at the Post-Graduate Programs in Production Engineering and Analysis and Modeling of Environmental Systems at UFMG.

Since his years as a Master's student, his work focuses on the relationship between science, technology and public policies, especially in the ones concerning environmental issues such as climate and deforestation.

After publishing an article that exposed how much soy and beef contaminated with deforestation was exported from Brazil to the European Union in 2020, Rajão and his colleagues started to work, in 2021, alongside the state government of Pará, Brazil, to develop SeloVerde Pará. The public platform for transparency and traceability of supply chains has been recognized by the EU as a leading example initiative.

Awards 
In 2022, Rajão and eleven colleagues received the Amílcar Herrera prize of the Latin-American Association of Social Studies of Science and Technology (ESOCITE) for the article "The risk of fake controversies for Brazilian environmental policies". The group found out evidences that a group of researchers lead by Evaristo de Miranda was creating false scientific controversies that impacted negatively on Brazilian environmental and health policies.

References 

1981 births
Living people